The Socialist Republic of Serbia, previously known as the People's Republic of Serbia, was one of the six constituent republics of the Socialist Federal Republic of Yugoslavia in what is now the modern day states of Serbia and the disputed territory of Kosovo. Its formation was initiated in 1941, and achieved in 1944–1946, when it was established as a federated republic within Yugoslavia. In that form, it lasted until the constitutional reforms from 1990 to 1992, when it was reconstituted, as the Republic of Serbia within the Federal Republic of Yugoslavia. It was the largest constituent republic of Yugoslavia, in terms of population and territory. Its capital, Belgrade, was also the federal capital of Yugoslavia.

History

World War II 

After the collapse of the Kingdom of Yugoslavia in the April War (1941), the entire country was occupied and partitioned between Axis powers. Central territories of Serbia and the northern region of Banat were occupied by Nazi Germany, that enforced direct control over the Territory of the Military Commander in Serbia, with a puppet Government installed in Belgrade. Southern regions of Metohija and Kosovo were occupied by Fascist Italy and annexed into the Italian Albania. Region of Bačka was annexed by Hungary, while Syrmia was possessed by the Independent State of Croatia. Southeastern parts of Serbia were occupied by Bulgaria. 

At the beginning of the occupation, there were two resistance movements: Chetniks and Partisans. They had conflicting ideological and political programs, and by 1943, Chetniks started to collaborate with Axis forces. Partisans advocated transformation of Yugoslavia into a federation, with Serbia becoming one of its federal units. In the autumn of 1941, first provisional institutions were established by partisans in some liberated territories, headed by the Main National Liberation Committee for Serbia. It was seated in Užice, and thus the movement became known as the Republic of Užice. However, the German offensive crushed this proto-state in December of the same year. After that, main partisan forces moved to Bosnia.

People's Republic of Serbia 

Serbia was liberated in the autumn of 1944, by partisan forces and the Red Army. Soon after the liberation of Belgrade on 20 October, creation of new administration was initiated. In November 1944, the Anti-fascist Assembly for the People's Liberation of Serbia was convened, affirming the policy of reconstituting Yugoslavia as a federation, with Serbia as one of its federal units. Thus was laid the foundation for the creation of the Federated State of Serbia, as a federated state within new Democratic Federal Yugoslavia. 

The process was formalised in April 1945, when the provisional People's Assembly of Serbia was created, also appointing the first People's Government of Serbia. Two newly created regions, Autonomous Province of Vojvodina and Autonomous Region of Kosovo and Metohija, decided to merge into Serbia. On November 29 (1945), Yugoslavia was officially proclaimed as federal republic, and in January 1946, after the first Constitution of federal Yugoslavia was adopted, the Federated State of Serbia was renamed to People's Republic of Serbia. 

In November 1946, elections for the Constitutional Assembly of Serbia were held, and in January 1947, Constitution of Serbia was adopted, reaffirming its position within Yugoslav federation, and also regulating the position of autonomous units (Vojvodina as autonomous province; Kosovo and Metohija as autonomous region). In 1953, a constitutional law was adopted, introducing further social reforms.

By that time, internal political life in Serbia was fully dominated by the Communist Party of Serbia, formed in May 1945 as a branch of the ruling Communist Party of Yugoslavia. In order to suppress remaining monarchist opposition, communists initiated the creation of a wider political coalition, thus establishing the People's Front of Yugoslavia (PFY), in August 1945. Other political parties were soon dissolved, and remnants of political life were constrained within the PFY, that was under full control of the ruling Communist Party.

Socialist Republic of Serbia 

In 1963, a new Yugoslav Constitution was adopted, renaming the federal state into the Socialist Federal Republic of Yugoslavia, and its federal units into socialist republics, thus introducing the name: Socialist Republic of Serbia.

In 1966, one of the most prominent Serbs in the Communist party and also vice-president of Yugoslavia (1963–1966) and founder of Yugoslav intelligence agency OZNA, Aleksandar Ranković was removed from positions due to allegations of spying on SFRY President Josip Broz Tito.

After the Croatian Spring in 1971, almost whole party leadership of Serbia was removed from office, under the charge of being "liberal". Latinka Perović and Marko Nikezić were marked as leaders of this liberal movement inside League of Communists of Serbia.

In 1974, new constitution was adopted, increasing the powers of provinces, and making them de facto republics. For the first time the institution of president was formed, as President of the Presidency of Socialist Republic of Serbia. Assembly was electing 15 members of the presidency and one president for a 4-year term, and later 2-year term. The new constitution practically suspended Serbia's authority over the provinces.

After the new constitution was adopted, Dragoslav Marković, then President of Serbia ordered a secret study on this issue. In January 1975, the Presidency of the Socialist Republic of Serbia requested a revision of constitutional solutions with explanation that the constitution divided the republic into three parts, thus preventing Serbia from exercising its "historic right to a nation state in the Yugoslav federation". Furthermore, the study Marković requested was completed in 1977 and was named The Blue Book. Although there were differing opinions in the state leadership on the position of the provinces – for example, Edvard Kardelj supported the demands of Serbian leaders – the result of the arbitration was the conclusion that the position of the provinces within Serbia should not be changed. The Federal leadership, led by Tito, believed that the constitutional solution from 1974 could satisfy all the claims of the Socialist Republic of Serbia, but also respect the specifics and special interests of the autonomous provinces. Although the conflict was (temporarily) pacified in this way, the issue remained unresolved. 

For most of its existence in the SFRY, Serbia was loyal and generally subordinate to the federal government. This changed after the death of Josip Broz Tito in 1980, when Albanian, as well as Serbian nationalism in Kosovo arose. In 1981, major protests erupted in Kosovo demanding the status of republic. The League of Communists was split on how to respond. At the same time, an economic crisis in Yugoslavia started. The leaders of the country were unable to carry out any reforms due to the political instability.

President of League of Communists of Serbia Slobodan Milošević visited Kosovo in April 1987 and promised rapid action in order to protect peace and the Serbs of Kosovo. Ethnic tensions in Kosovo heated up when a Kosovo Albanian soldier opened fire on his fellow soldiers in Paraćin, in an event known as the Paraćin massacre. Then President of Serbia Ivan Stambolić wanted to make compromise, rather than fast solution. He found himself in a clash with Milošević. This conflict culminated with 8th Session and replacement of Stambolić with Petar Gračanin as President of Serbia.

Constitutional reform 
In 1988, new amendments to the Yugoslav Constitution were adopted, initiating a process of democratization. During 1988 and 1989, a successful round of coups in the Communist party leadership, known as Antibureucratic revolution, in Vojvodina, Kosovo as well as Montenegro, replaced autonomous leaderships in this regions. The coups were led by Slobodan Milošević; supporter of  Serbian nationalism. The events were condemned by the communist governments of the western Yugoslav republics (especially SR Slovenia and SR Croatia), who successfully resisted the attempts to expand the revolt onto their territories, and turned against Milošević. The rising antagonism eventually resulted in the dissolution of the ruling League of Communists of Yugoslavia in 1990, and subsequently in the breakup of Yugoslavia.

In 1989, Slobodan Milošević was elected as President of the State Presidency of Serbia. He demanded that the federal Yugoslav government act for the interests of Serbia in Kosovo by sending in the Yugoslav People's Army to suppress separatism in the province. At the same time, several reforms of federal electoral system were proposed, with Serbia supporting a "one-citizen, one-vote" system, which would have given a majority of votes to Serbs. By that time, ethnic tensions in Yugoslavia increased, and the ruling League of Communists of Yugoslavia collapsed, followed by the crisis of federal institutions. After these events, in 1989 Assembly of Socialist Republic of Serbia voted for constitution amendments that revoked high autonomy for provinces of Vojvodina and Kosovo.

After Slovenian authorities forbid a group of Serbs supporting his politics to gather in Ljubljana, Milosević started a trade war with Socialist Republic of Slovenia in late 1989. This Serbian–Slovenian conflict culminated in January 1990 on 14th Congress of the League of Communists of Yugoslavia when Slovenians left the meeting followed by Croatian delegates.

After 1990, the state was known simply as Republic of Serbia, and in December of the same year, Slobodan Milošević was elected as first President of the Republic. In 1992, when the Federal Republic of Yugoslavia was formed, Serbia became one of its two constituent republics. In 2003, this state union was re-formed into Serbia and Montenegro, and in 2006, Serbia became an independent republic after Montenegro separated.

Administrative divisions

Within Socialist Republic of Serbia two autonomous provinces existed: Socialist Autonomous Province of Vojvodina and Socialist Autonomous Province of Kosovo. The central part of the Socialist Republic of Serbia located outside of the two autonomous provinces was generally known as "Serbia proper" ("Uža Srbija").

Geographically SR Serbia bordered Hungary to the north, Romania and Bulgaria to the east and Albania to the south-west. Within Yugoslavia, it bordered SR Macedonia to the south and SRs Montenegro, Bosnia and Herzegovina and Croatia to the west.

Demographics

1971 census
In 1971, total population of the Socialist Republic of Serbia numbered 8,446,590 people, including:
Serbs = 6,142,070 (72.7%)
Albanians = 984,761 (11.66%)
Hungarians = 430,314 (5.10%)
Croats = 184,913 (2.19%)
ethnic Muslims = 154,330 (1.83%) 
ethnic Yugoslavs = 123,824 (1.47%)
Slovaks = 76,733 (0.82%)
Romanians (self-declared) = 57,419 (0.62%)
Bulgarians = 53,800 (0.58%)
Romani = 49,894 (0.54%)
Macedonians = 42,675 (0.46%)
Rusyns = 20,608 (0.22%)
Turks = 18,220 (0.20%)
Slovenes = 15,957 (0.17%)
"Vlachs" (Romanians) = 14,724 (0.16%)

1981 census
In 1981, total population of the Socialist Republic of Serbia numbered 9,313,677 people, including:
Serbs = 6,331,527 (67.96%)
Albanians = 1,303,032 (13.99%)
Yugoslavs = 441,941 (4.75%)
Hungarians = 390,468 (4.19%)
Muslims = 215,166 (2.31%)
Croats = 149,368 (1.60%)
Romani = 110,956 (1.19%)
Macedonians = 48,986 (0.53%)
Slovenes = 12,006 (0.13%)

Politics

During the socialist era in Yugoslavia, the only legal political parties were the three branches of the federal League of Communists of Yugoslavia (SKJ): League of Communists of Serbia (SKS), League of Communists of Vojvodina (SKV) and League of Communists of Kosovo (SKK). The Serbian branch remained relatively stable and loyal to the federal party until the late 1980s, when it became split over what action to take in Kosovo when protests and fights broke out between ethnic Albanians and Serbs.

The more traditional Communists supported President Ivan Stambolić, who advocated continued neutrality as a means to solve the dispute; while more radical and nationalist-leaning members supported Slobodan Milosević, who advocated the protection of Kosovo Serbs, who had claimed that their population was being pressured to leave Kosovo by Albanian separatists. Milosević utilized public sentiment and opposition to Kosovo Albanian separatism to rally large numbers of supporters to help him overthrow the Communist leadership in Vojvodina, Kosovo and the Socialist Republic of Montenegro in what was known as the anti-bureaucratic revolution. Afterward, the Serbian League of Communists selected Milosević as its leader. Milosević took a hard stand on Albanian nationalism in Kosovo and pressured the Yugoslav government to give him emergency powers to deal with Kosovo Albanian separatists. Furthermore, he reduced the autonomy of the autonomous provinces of Kosovo and Vojvodina and installed politicians loyal to him to serve as their representatives.

In the congress of the Yugoslav League of Communists in 1990, Milosević and his subordinate representatives for Vojvodina, Kosovo and the Socialist Republic of Montenegro attempted to silence opposition from the Socialist Republic of Slovenia who opposed the actions taken against Kosovo Albanian leadership, by blocking all reforms proposed by the Slovene representatives. The tactic failed and Slovenia, along with its ally Croatia, abdicated from the Yugoslav Communist Party. This caused the Yugoslav Communist party to fall apart, and then the state of Yugoslavia itself one year later.

Government

Since 1945, the most senior state official in Serbia, and thus de facto head of state, was President of the People's Assembly of Serbia, who also presided over the collective Presidency of the People's Assembly (1945–1953), and Presidency of the Assembly (1953–1990). In 1974, new Constitution of Serbia was adopted, and collective state presidency was formed, not as a committee of the Assembly, but as a supreme governing body. Since then, President of the Presidency served as the most senior state official of the Socialist Republic of Serbia. At first, President was elected for 4 years mandate, but in 1982 it was lowered to 2 years. 

Main executive body, since 1945, was the People's Government of Serbia. In 1953, it was renamed as the Executive Council of Serbia. It served as the executive branch of the People's Assembly. President of the Executive Council had a role of Prime Minister.

See also
 History of Serbia
 History of the Serbs
 History of Yugoslavia

References

Sources

External links
 

 
 
Communism in Serbia
Socialist Federal Republic of Yugoslavia
Serbia
1944 establishments in Yugoslavia
1990 disestablishments in Yugoslavia
Serbia